Sääminki is countryside and former municipality of Finland. Most of Sääminki municipality was incorporated in 1973 with the Savonlinna town and the rest with Punkaharju municipality.

It is located in the province of Eastern Finland and is part of the Southern Savonia region. The municipality had a population of 11,710 and covered an area of 1009,9  km² (31 December 1970). The population density was 11.60 inhabitants per km².

References

External links
 Map of the Sääminki

Former municipalities of Finland
Savonlinna